Batchuluuny Bat–Orgil (born March 16, 1969) is a Mongolian short track speed skater. 

Bat–Orgil gained attention at the 1994 Winter Olympics in Lillehammer when he was the sole athlete in the Mongolian team.  He participated in two short track speed skating events, the men's 500 metres (24th) and the men's 1000 metres (29th). 

The Mongolian team was originally unable to qualify any athletes for the 1994 Winter Olympics because of stricter standards ordered by international sporting federations, but when the North Korean team elected not to participate, several spots opened up in short track speed skating. By then, the Mongolians had left their temporary training base in Germany and headed home. Bat-Orgil, one of those eligible, needed eight days to reach Mongolia by train. When he arrived, a fax was waiting from the Lillehammer Olympic Organizing Committee. Bat-Orgil got back on the train and headed west. 

He missed the opening ceremony but was able to participate in the closing ceremony as a flagbearer for Mongolia.

References

1969 births
Living people
Mongolian male short track speed skaters
Mongolian male speed skaters
Olympic short track speed skaters of Mongolia
Short track speed skaters at the 1994 Winter Olympics
Short track speed skaters at the 1999 Asian Winter Games